Traditionally, a clarinet quartet is a chamber musical ensemble made up of one clarinet, plus the standard string trio of one violin, one viola and one cello. Nowadays, the term clarinet quartet can also refer to a combination of four clarinets of any size [including (contr)alto and (contra)bass clarinet, and basset horn]. The term is also used to refer to a piece written for any of these ensembles.

History
During the second half of eighteenth and the first of the nineteenth centuries a large number of quartets for clarinet and string trio were written and published, particularly in Paris, as they proved highly popular in Parisian salon concerts, apparently even more so than quintets for clarinet and strings. Among the earliest examples are the six quartets by Carl Stamitz published as his opus 8 in 1773. Most of these are in a concertante style, treating the clarinet as soloist.

Works for clarinet quartet
 Carl Stamitz – Six Clarinet Quartets, op. 8 (1773)
 Christian Cannabich – two quartets for oboe/clarinet, violin, viola and cello/bassoon (1774)
 Johann Küchler (1770s)
 Frédéric Blasius
 Three Clarinet Quartets (1782-84)
 Six Clarinet Quartets, op. 13 (ca. 1788)
 Clarinet Quartet, op. 2 (ca. 1799)
 Georg Friedrich Fuchs
 Clarinet Quartet in B-flat major, op. 2 nr. 1 (1788-91)
 Clarinet Quartet in E-flat major, op. 2 nr. 2 (1788-91)
 Clarinet Quartet in B-flat major, op. 2 nr. 3 (1788-91)
 Michèl Yost and Johann Vogel (ca. 1789)
 Václav Pichl (ca. 1790)
 Charles Bochsa (ca. 1795)
 Paul Struck
 Clarinet Quartet in F major, op. 12 (ca. 1795)
 Charles-Simon Catel
 Clarinet Quartet in E-flat major, op. 2 nr. 1 (ca. 1796)
 Clarinet Quartet in B-flat major, op. 2 nr. 2 (ca. 1796)
 Clarinet Quartet in F major, op. 2 nr. 3 (ca. 1796)
 Franz Anton Hoffmeister (ca. 1802)
 Franz Krommer
 Clarinet Quartet in B-flat major, op. 21 nr. 1 [P IX:4] (ca. 1802)
 Clarinet Quartet in E-flat major, op. 21 nr. 2 [P IX:3] (ca. 1802)
 Clarinet Quartet in E-flat major, op. 69 [P IX:5] (ca. 1811)
 Clarinet Quartet in D major, op. 82 [P IX:12] (ca. 1814)
 Clarinet Quartet in B-flat major, op. 83 [P IX:13] (ca. 1816)
 Carl Andreas Göpfert (ca. 1803 and 1818)
 Jean-Xavier Lefèvre (ca. 1805)
 Johann Nepomuk Hummel
 Clarinet Quartet in E-flat major, S 78 (1808)
 Bernhard Crusell
 Clarinet Quartet in E-flat major, op. 2 (1811)
 Clarinet Quartet in C minor, op. 4 (1817)
 Clarinet Quartet in D major, op. 7 (1823)
 Iwan Müller (1817-18)
 François Devienne
 Georg Druschetzky
 Pieter Hellendaal
 Leopold Koželuch
 John Mahon
 Philipp Meissner
 Ignaz Pleyel
 Gaspard Proksch
 Valentin Roeser
 Nicholas Schmidt
 Albert Walter
 Johann Baptist Wanhal
 Clarinet Quartet in F
 Clarinet Quartet in B-flat major
 Johann Paul Wesseley
 Peter Winter
 Krzysztof Penderecki – Quartet for Clarinet and String Trio (1993)

Arrangements
Around 1799 arrangements for clarinet quartet of three of Wolfgang Amadeus Mozart's chamber works appeared in publication, possibly by Johann Anton André: the violin sonata in B-flat major, K 378/317d, the violin sonata in E-flat major, K 380/374f, and the piano trio in G major, K 496.

References

External links
 

String instruments